Harald Petzold (born 28 March 1962 in Seebad Heringsdorf) is a German politician from The Left.

Life 
Petzold studied music and German language. He worked as a teacher in Brandenburg. From 1990 to 1999 Petzold was a member of the Landtag of Brandenburg. Since 2013 Petzold has been a member of the German Bundestag.

References

External links 
 Bundestag.de: Harald Petzold

Members of the Bundestag for Brandenburg
Members of the Landtag of Brandenburg
LGBT members of the Bundestag
Gay politicians
1962 births
Living people
Members of the Bundestag 2013–2017
Members of the Bundestag for The Left